LDC (Lambert Dodard Chancereul) is the largest poultry meat group in Europe. LDC carries out 578 million animal slaughters per year. The total revenue amounted to €5.1 billion in 2021/22.

The company is headquartered in Sablé-sur-Sarthe in France and operates 93 production sites in five European countries.

History 
The company was founded in 1968 as a merger of the family business Lambert based in Sablé-sur-Sarthe and Dodard-Chancereul based in Saint-Denis-d’Anjou. In 1970, the company expanded and opened a poultry slaughterhouse in Sablé-sur-Sarthe.

In the 1990s, LDC took over the convenience food company La Toque Angevine. In 1995, LDC went public at the Euronext Paris and conducted the first international takeover with Hermanos Saiz from Spain. Subsequently, the French company started an international expansion. Among others, the company took over the Polish company Drosed in 2000, the Hungarian Tranzit group in 2018 and the British poultry company Capestone Organic Poultry in 2021.

LDC also expanded in the French poultry farming and took over multiple competitors. In 2018, LDC took over parts of the insolvent Groupe Doux, and in 2022 the company Matines, one of the leading French egg producers, from the Avril group.

In 2022, LDC was struck by the historic outbreak of influenza A virus subtype H5N1 in France that lead to the culling of more than 12 million birds. The company had to shut down four slaughterhouses.

The executive management was passed from Denis Lambert to Philippe Gélin in 2022.

Structure 
With more than 578 million animal slaughters per year, LDC is the largest poultry meat company in France and Europe. Further business areas are the production of pork, beef, rabbit meat and eggs.

The company is structure in the three divisions: Poultry, International and Catered-Food.

60% of the revenue is generated in France, where LDC has a share of 40% on the poultry market and 50% in the market for chilled delicatessen. The international revenue was generated to large parts in Poland (67%), followed by Hungary (22%), Belgium (6%) and the United Kingdom (4,5%). The company also serves the German market via the sites in Poland

Sales 
LDC markets its products under a number of brands, among others Le Gaulois, Maître Coq and Marie. LDC also supplies chicken to McDonald's.

Shareholders 
Around 70% of the shares are owned by the families Lambert (39.2%), Chancereul (17.3%), Huttepain (8.86%) and Guillet (3.89%). Around 13% are in public float, the other shares belong to white-collar workers, to the Sofiprotéol group and to the cooperative Agricole Fermiers de Loué.

Controversies 
After an analysis of chicken meat samples in 2020, Germanwatch criticized that 57% of the samples from LDC were contaminated and 45% of the samples were found featuring antimicrobial resistance against drugs of last resort.

References

External links 

 Official website

Food and drink companies established in 1968
French companies established in 1968
Poultry companies
Intensive farming
Meat companies of France
Companies based in Pays de la Loire
Companies listed on Euronext Paris